The sixth edition of La Course by Le Tour de France, a women's cycling race held in France, took place on 19 July 2019.

Route and organisation 
The race started and finished in Pau, taking in five laps of a hilly circuit covering 121 km. It was held before stage 13 of the men's 2019 Tour de France, which used one lap of the circuit as an individual time trial. 

The event was organised by ASO, which also organises the Tour de France. It was the 15th race of the 2019 UCI Women's World Tour.

Results

See also
 2019 in women's road cycling

References

External links
 

2019 UCI Women's World Tour
2019
2019 in French sport
La Course